Frank Aloysius Tierney (April 13, 1879 - September 17, 1923) was a tenor singer, the secretary to Governor Martin Henry Glynn, and later the Deputy Commissioner for Workmen's Compensation in Albany, New York.

Biography
He died on September 17, 1923. His widow died in 1943.

External links

References

1879 births
1923 deaths
19th-century American singers